Players and pairs who neither have high enough rankings nor receive wild cards may participate in a qualifying tournament held one week before the annual Wimbledon Tennis Championships.

Seeds

  Arnaud Boetsch (qualified)
  Chuck Adams (second round)
  Andrei Olhovskiy (qualifying competition, lucky loser)
  Henrik Holm (qualified)
  Javier Frana (qualified)
  Francisco Roig (second round)
  Diego Nargiso (qualifying competition, lucky loser)
  Bryan Shelton (second round)
  Danilo Marcelino (qualified)
  Fernando Roese (qualified)
  Mark Kratzmann (qualified)
  Glenn Layendecker (qualified)
  Jamie Morgan (second round)
  Daniel Orsanic (qualified)
  Niclas Kroon (qualifying competition, lucky loser)
  Neil Borwick (second round)
  Simon Youl (second round)
  Brian Garrow (second round)
  Francisco Montana (first round)
  Marcos Ondruska (first round)
  Todd Martin (first round)
  John Stimpson (second round)
  Martin Wostenholme (first round)
  Martin Laurendeau (qualifying competition, lucky loser)
  Brett Steven (second round)
  Slobodan Živojinović (qualified)
  Gianluca Pozzi (qualified)
  Maurice Ruah (qualifying competition, lucky loser)
  Steve Bryan (qualifying competition)
  Felix Barrientos (first round)
  Carl Limberger (qualifying competition)
  Sandon Stolle (qualified)

Qualifiers

  Arnaud Boetsch
  Sandon Stolle
  Richard Vogel
  Henrik Holm
  Javier Frana
  Gianluca Pozzi
  Slobodan Živojinović
  Mark Keil
  Danilo Marcelino
  Fernando Roese
  Mark Kratzmann
  Glenn Layendecker
  Glenn Michibata
  Daniel Orsanic
  Broderick Dyke
  Johan Kriek

Lucky losers

  Andrei Olhovskiy
  Maurice Ruah
  Diego Nargiso
  Martin Laurendeau
  Niclas Kroon

Qualifying draw

First qualifier

Second qualifier

Third qualifier

Fourth qualifier

Fifth qualifier

Sixth qualifier

Seventh qualifier

Eighth qualifier

Ninth qualifier

Tenth qualifier

Eleventh qualifier

Twelfth qualifier

Thirteenth qualifier

Fourteenth qualifier

Fifteenth qualifier

Sixteenth qualifier

External links

 1991 Wimbledon Championships – Men's draws and results at the International Tennis Federation

Men's Singles Qualifying
Wimbledon Championship by year – Men's singles qualifying